A Killing Frost is the sixth and final novel in the series created by R.D. Wingfield. It sees the slovenly, disorganised Detective Inspector Frost once again put under pressure to solve multiple complex cases in a short period of time, whilst attempting to avoid being sacked by his superior officers. Amongst his many enemies within the Denton Police is the newly transferred Detective Chief Inspector Skinner, who will stop at nothing to get Frost out of the job. Unlike all of the previous Frost novels, A Killing Frost was not adapted in to a television episode of A Touch of Frost.

Plot
The long-suffering Superintendent Mullet has enlisted the help of a new D.C.I, Skinner, to rid the Denton Police of Inspector Frost once-and-for-all. The pair see him as a hindrance to the Police Service, which is struggling to adapt to the modern era of Policing. Inspector Frost is his usual uncouth self; derogatory towards women and with a slightly perverse sense of humour, but through this we can see that in a way, they are right: Frost has no place in the modern Police Service and he knows it all-too-well.

Meanwhile, Inspector Frost has to contend with missing children, severed body parts, rape cases and a man claiming to have killed his wife (even though she reports in as alive and living outside Denton). Every time Frost takes on a case, another seems to pop-up, and he begins to feel the strain.

Things take an alarming turn for the worse as his nemesis discovers that Frost has been forging petrol receipts for some time (a crime for which D.I Frost could very easily be fired), Frost is cornered in an abandoned butcher's shop by a knife-wielding man and the whole situation is brought to an explosive end in an armed stand-off at a remote farmhouse.

2008 novels
Crime novels